The expression “the elephant in the room” (or "the elephant in the living room") is a metaphorical idiom in English for an important or enormous topic, question, or controversial issue that is obvious or that everyone knows about but no one mentions or wants to discuss because it makes at least some of them uncomfortable and is personally, socially, or politically embarrassing, controversial, inflammatory, or dangerous.

It is based on the idea/thought that something as conspicuous as an elephant can appear to be overlooked in codified social interactions and that the sociology/psychology of repression also operates on the macro scale. 

Various languages around the world have words that describe similar concepts.

Origins
In 1814, Ivan Krylov (17691844), poet and fabulist, wrote a fable entitled "The Inquisitive Man", which tells of a man who goes to a museum and notices all sorts of tiny things, but fails to notice an elephant. The phrase became proverbial. Fyodor Dostoevsky in his novel Demons wrote, "Belinsky was just like Krylov's Inquisitive Man, who didn't notice the elephant in the museum...."

The Oxford English Dictionary gives the first recorded use of the phrase, as a simile, in The New York Times on June 20, 1959: "Financing schools has become a problem about equal to having an elephant in the living room. It's so big you just can't ignore it." According to the website the Phrase Finder, the first known use in print is from 1952.

This idiomatic expression may have been in general use much earlier than 1959. For example, the phrase appears 44 years earlier in the pages of the British Journal of Education in 1915. The sentence was presented as a trivial illustration of a question British schoolboys would be able to answer, e.g., "Is there an elephant in the class-room?"

The first widely disseminated conceptual reference was a story written by Mark Twain in 1882, "The Stolen White Elephant", which recounts the inept, far-ranging activities of detectives trying to find an elephant that was right on the spot after all. This story, combined with Dostoyevsky's white bear, may have been on Jerome Frank's mind when he wrote in his dissent in United States v. Antonelli Fireworks (1946) and again in dissent in United States v. Leviton (1951) of "the Mark Twain story of the little boy who was told to stand in a corner and not to think of a white elephant."

The phrase may also be a response to philosopher Alfred North Whitehead's 1929 description of the validity of immediate experience: "Sometimes we see an elephant, and sometimes we do not. The result is that an elephant, when present, is noticed."

In 1935, comedian Jimmy Durante starred on Broadway in the Billy Rose Broadway musical Jumbo, in which a police officer stops him as he leads a live elephant and asks, "What are you doing with that elephant?"  Durante's reply, "What elephant?" was a regular show-stopper. Durante reprises the piece in the 1962 film version of the play, Billy Rose's Jumbo.

Usage
The term refers to a question, problem, solution, or controversial issue which is obvious to everyone who knows about the situation, but which is deliberately ignored because to do otherwise would cause great embarrassment, sadness, or arguments, or is simply taboo. The idiom can imply a value judgment that the issue ought to be discussed openly, or it can simply be an acknowledgment that the issue is there and not going to go away by itself.

The term is often used to describe an issue that involves a social taboo or which generates disagreement, such as race, religion, politics, homosexuality, mental illness, or suicide.  It is applicable when a subject is emotionally charged; and the people who might have spoken up decide that it is probably best avoided.

The idiom is commonly used in addiction recovery terminology to describe the reluctance of friends and family of an addicted person to discuss the person's problem, thus aiding the person's denial. Especially in reference to alcohol abuse, the idiom is sometimes coupled with that of the pink elephant, "the pink elephant in the room."

The expression has also been used as a metaphorical idiom in Spanish.  In 1994, the 8000 Process was a legal investigation of a Colombian presidential campaign.  There were accusations that the campaign of Colombian Liberal Party candidate Ernesto Samper was partially funded with drug money from the Cali Cartel.  Insisting on his innocence, Samper stated that if drug money had entered the presidential campaign, it had done so "behind his back".  Cardinal Pedro Rubiano, a leader of Colombia's Catholic Church, stated in an interview that not knowing that drug money financed part of the presidential campaign was similar to not noticing "an elephant entering one's living room".  Since then, the events that led to drug money financing the "Samper for President" campaign have been referred to as "The Elephant."

The title of Alan Clarke's 1989 television film Elephant references the term.  This was in turn influential in the naming of Gus Van Sant's 2003 film of the same name, although Van Sant thought a different expression was being referenced. Alexandra Burke's 2012 single "Elephant" also uses the concept.

Similar
A variation is the phrase "elephant in the corner" which is infrequently used to the same effect.

Logician and philosopher Ludwig Wittgenstein used an example of a rhinoceros in the room either to show the impossibility of disproving negative existential statements, or possibly a more subtle philosophical point.

See also

 
 , exhibition featuring a literal interpretation of the idiom 
 
 
 
 
 
 
 
 
 
 , 2011 documentary

Notes

References
 Cambridge University Press. (2009). Cambridge academic content dictionary (Paul Heacock, editor). New York: Cambridge University Press. /; 
Dostoyevsky, Fyodor. (1994). Demons: a novel in three parts (Richard Pevear and Larissa Volokhonsky, translators). London: Vintage. 
 __. (1915). Journal of education, Vol. 37. Oxford: Oxford University Press. 
 Palta, Namrata. (2007). Spoken English: a Detailed and Simplified Course for Learning Spoken English. New Delhi: Lotus Press. ;

External links

 Oxford Advanced Learners Dictionary (OALD), Word of the Month: Elephant in the room

English-language idioms
Quotations
1950s neologisms
Metaphors referring to elephants
Etiquette